Gawi Rural LLG is a local-level government (LLG) of East Sepik Province, Papua New Guinea. Sepik Hill languages are spoken in this LLG.

Wards
01. Sapande
02. Yamanumbu
03. Pagwi
04. Sapanaut
05. Yenjinmangua
06. Nyaurange
07. Kandinge
08. Korogu
09. Sotmeri
10. Indabu
11. Yenchen
12. Kanganamun
13. Tegowi
14. Parambei
15. Maringei
16. Aibom
17. Wombun
18. Indinge
19. Kirimbit
20. Luluk
21. Timbunmeri
22. Changriman
23. Mari (Mari language (Sepik) speakers)
24. Yembiyembi (Bisis language speakers)
25. Paliagwi

References

Local-level governments of East Sepik Province